Roedgen is a small town in the commune of Reckange-sur-Mess, in south-western Luxembourg.  , the town has a population of 325.

Reckange-sur-Mess
Towns in Luxembourg